Pardis County is in Tehran province, Iran. The capital of the county is the city of Pardis. At the 2006 and 2011 National Censuses, the region's population was a part of the Central District of Tehran County) Bumahen, Pardis, and most of Siyahrud Rural District separated from Tehran County on 29 December 2012 to establish Pardis County. At the 2016 census, the new county's population was 169,060 in 53,367 households. In the south of the county around 5km to Bumehen is the Technology Park, where various R&D institutes and banking companies are located.

Administrative divisions

The population history and structural changes of Pardis County's administrative divisions over three consecutive censuses are shown in the following table. The latest census shows two districts, four rural districts, and two cities.

References

 

Counties of Tehran Province